Hasso Hofmann (4 August 1934 – 21 January 2021) was a German philosopher and jurist.

Biography
Hofmann studied philosophy and law at Heidelberg University, Ludwig Maximilian University of Munich, and the University of Erlangen-Nuremberg under professors such as Ernst Forsthoff, Wolfgang Kunkel, Hans-Georg Gadamer, and Karl Löwith. After the Staatsexamen, he became a certified lawyer. He taught at the University of Würzburg from 1976 to 1992, when he became a professor at the Humboldt University of Berlin, eventually serving as Vice-President of the university. He was also a member of the Bavarian Academy of Sciences and Humanities and the Berlin-Brandenburg Academy of Sciences and Humanities.

Hasso Hofmann died in Würzburg on 21 January 2021 at the age of 86.

Publications
Legitimität gegen Legalität. Der Weg der politischen Philosophie Carl Schmitts (1964)
Repräsentation. Studien zur Wort- und Begriffsgeschichte von der Antike bis ins 19. Jahrhundert (1974)
Legitimität und Rechtsgeltung. Verfassungstheoretische Bemerkungen zu einem Problem der Staatslehre und der Rechtsphilosophie (1977)
Rechtsfragen der atomaren Entsorgung (1981)
Recht – Politik – Verfassung. Studien zur Geschichte der politischen Philosophie (1986)
Verfassungsrechtliche Perspektiven. Aufsätze aus den Jahren 1980–1994 (1995)
Einführung in die Rechts- und Staatsphilosophie (2000)
Recht und Kultur. Drei Reden (= Wissenschaftliche Abhandlungen und Reden zur Philosophie, Politik und Geistesgeschichte (2009)
Rechtsphilosophie nach 1945. Zur Geistesgeschichte der Bundesrepublik Deutschland (2012)

References

1934 births
2021 deaths
German philosophers
Academic staff of the Humboldt University of Berlin
Academic staff of the University of Würzburg